Nico-Jan Hoogma (born 26 October 1968) is a Dutch former professional footballer who played as a defender. He started his career with SC Cambuur and after three years moved to FC Twente. In 1998, he moved to Germany, where he played for Hamburger SV, before seeing out his career with Heracles Almelo, aged 38. Between 1 Januari 2007 and 1 March 2018 he was managing director at Heracles Almelo. Sinds 1 March 2018 he is Director of Football at the Royal Netherlands Football Association.

Honours
 DFB-Ligapokal: 2003

References

External links
 

1968 births
Living people
Sportspeople from Heerenveen
Dutch footballers
Association football defenders
SC Cambuur players
FC Twente players
Hamburger SV players
Heracles Almelo players
Bundesliga players
Eredivisie players
Dutch expatriate footballers
Dutch expatriate sportspeople in Germany
Expatriate footballers in Germany
Footballers from Friesland
Heracles Almelo non-playing staff
Dutch sports executives and administrators